The Midland Great Western Railway (MGWR) Classes 6, 8, 10, 11, 17 and 18 were  locomotives introduced in the period 1852-1870. The 22 locomotives were spread across 6 different manufacturers and all were withdrawn in the decade between 1880 and 1890 though some donated parts to other builds at Broadstone Works.

MGWR Class 6

Ordered from R. B. Longridge and Company, the MGWR Class 6 were  locomotives were the first coupled locomotives on the MGWR.  They ran high mileages for goods engines and were noted on passenger duties in Mayo in 1876. They were withdrawn in 1880.

MGWR Class 8

The four  engines ordered from William Fairbairn & Sons in 1852 were designated MGWR Class 8. They may have resembled similar locomotives order for the Waterford and Limerick Railway at this time, later designated GSWR Class 264. Locomotive No. 35 is noted for working the Ballaghaderreen branch line from 1874 (when the line opened) until the locomotive was withdrawn in 1885.

MGWR Class 10

The MGWR Class 10 engines from Thomas Grendon and Company of Drogheda were introduced in the period 1856-1860.

MGWR Class 11

MGWR Class 11 consisted of a single engine from R. Stephenson. The almost-immediate delivery from time of order indicated it was likely the engine had already been constructed.

MGWR Class 17

This Fossick & Hackworth locomotive was originally supplied to the Dublin & Meath Railway where it was known as drag-all. In 1864, the Dublin & Meath Railway were undergoing some financial difficulties which may account for the locomotives transfer. It was later renumbered from 11 to 85 to be outside the range used for the later MGWR Class 18. It was reputed to be less successful on the MGWR.

MGWR Class 18

The final  engines ordered in the pre Martin Atock era were from Avonside and formed MGWR Class 18. They were the only significant non 4-2-0 order made by the locomotive engineer Robert Rampage. They were replaced in 1889 by six Broadstone build 2-4-0 locomotives of MGWR Class 7–12 carrying the same numbers and names.

References 

2-4-0 locomotives
5 ft 3 in gauge locomotives
Railway locomotives introduced in 1852
06
Scrapped locomotives
Steam locomotives of Ireland